Revolution Girl Style Now is a demo album by the punk rock band Bikini Kill.  It was self-released in cassette form in 1991 and recorded at Yoyo Studios.

The 1991 cassette was released for the first time on vinyl, CD and digital formats in 2015 via the band's own label, Bikini Kill Records. The reissue includes three previously unreleased tracks: "Ocean Song", "Just Once", and "Playground". The album has most recently been reissued on red vinyl in a "Limited edition 30th anniversary pressing on red vinyl" via Bikini Kill records.

The name of the album was a slogan that Bikini Kill used along with "Stop the J-Word Jealousy from Killing Girl Love". It dates back to at least the summer of 1991 when Bikini Kill and Bratmobile, originally from Olympia, Washington, traveled to Washington DC for an extended visit. Daniel Sinker, founder of Punk Planet magazine has written:

Track listing

References

1991 albums
Self-released albums
Bikini Kill albums